Trigonodesma may refer to:
Trigonodesma (bivalve) Wood, 1864, a genus of fossil bivalves in the family Noetiidae
*Trigonodesma (moth) Wileman & South, 1921, a genus of moths in the family Noctuidae